István Hernek (23 April 1935 – 25 September 2014) was a Hungarian sprint canoer who competed in the mid-1950s. At the 1956 Summer Olympics in Melbourne, he won a silver medal in the C-1 1000 m event. Hernek also won two medals at the 1954 ICF Canoe Sprint World Championships with a silver in the C-1 1000 m and a bronze in the C-1 10000 m events.

References

István Hernek's profile at Sports Reference.com
István Hernek's obituary 

1935 births
2014 deaths
Canoeists at the 1956 Summer Olympics
Hungarian male canoeists
Olympic canoeists of Hungary
Olympic silver medalists for Hungary
Olympic medalists in canoeing
ICF Canoe Sprint World Championships medalists in Canadian
Medalists at the 1956 Summer Olympics
20th-century Hungarian people